The Strouds Ridge Preserve is a project of Athens, Ohio, to create a greenbelt buffer and trail system on the outskirts of the city. All these properties, which include the pre-existing  Sells Park, are contiguous with Strouds Run State Park.

Property acquisitions
One of the acquisitions was subsequently dedicated as the Dale and Jackie Riddle State Nature Preserve, and is otherwise known as Hawk Woods, an  old-growth forest. One of the tracts, the Della Drive Tract, was acquired by Athens County, not the city. Also nearby are the -acre Blair Preserve, the -acre Tucker Run Preserve, the -acre Mary Beth Zak Lohse Preserve, the -acre Canaan Preserve and the -acre Baker Preserve of the Athens Conservancy.

Trails
The trail system is known as the Athens Trail system, and connects with the trails at the state park.  The trail system centers around the Athens Trail, currently  but slated to be a full-loop trail around the City of Athens, and the Rockhouse Trail, a  scenic trail.

References

External links
 U.S. Geological Survey Map at the U.S. Geological Survey Map Website. Retrieved November 5th, 2022.

Protected areas of Athens County, Ohio
Transportation in Athens County, Ohio